Gallium nitride is a binary III/V direct bandgap semiconductor commonly used in blue light-emitting diodes since the 1990s. The compound is a very hard material that has a Wurtzite crystal structure. Its wide band gap of 3.4 eV affords it special properties for applications in optoelectronic, high-power and high-frequency devices. For example, GaN is the substrate which makes violet (405 nm) laser diodes possible, without requiring nonlinear optical frequency-doubling.

Its sensitivity to ionizing radiation is low (like other group III nitrides), making it a suitable material for solar cell arrays for satellites. Military and space applications could also benefit as devices have shown stability in high radiation environments.

Because GaN transistors can operate at much higher temperatures and work at much higher voltages than gallium arsenide (GaAs) transistors, they make ideal power amplifiers at microwave frequencies. In addition, GaN offers promising characteristics for THz devices. Due to high power density and voltage breakdown limits GaN is also emerging as a promising candidate for 5G cellular base station applications.

Physical properties

GaN is a very hard (Knoop hardness 14.21 GPa), mechanically stable wide-bandgap semiconductor material with high heat capacity and thermal conductivity. In its pure form it resists cracking and can be deposited in thin film on sapphire or silicon carbide, despite the mismatch in their lattice constants. GaN can be doped with silicon (Si) or with oxygen to n-type and with magnesium (Mg) to p-type. However, the Si and Mg atoms change the way the GaN crystals grow, introducing tensile stresses and making them brittle. Gallium nitride compounds also tend to have a high dislocation density, on the order of 108 to 1010 defects per square centimeter. 

The U.S. Army Research Laboratory (ARL) provided the first measurement of the high field electron velocity in GaN in 1999. Scientists at ARL experimentally obtained a peak steady-state velocity of 1.9 x 107 cm/s, with a transit time of 2.5 picoseconds, attained at an electric field of 225 kV/cm. With this information, the electron mobility was calculated, thus providing data for the design of GaN devices.

Developments
GaN with a high crystalline quality can be obtained by depositing a buffer layer at low temperatures. Such high-quality GaN led to the discovery of p-type GaN, p-n junction blue/UV-LEDs and room-temperature stimulated emission (essential for laser action). This has led to the commercialization of high-performance blue LEDs and long-lifetime violet laser diodes, and to the development of nitride-based devices such as UV detectors and high-speed field-effect transistors.

LEDs
High-brightness GaN light-emitting diodes (LEDs) completed the range of primary colors, and made possible applications such as daylight visible full-color LED displays, white LEDs and blue laser devices. The first GaN-based high-brightness LEDs used a thin film of GaN deposited via metalorganic vapour-phase epitaxy (MOVPE) on sapphire. Other substrates used are zinc oxide, with lattice constant mismatch of only 2% and silicon carbide (SiC). Group III nitride semiconductors are, in general, recognized as one of the most promising semiconductor families for fabricating optical devices in the visible short-wavelength and UV region.

GaN transistors and power ICs
The very high breakdown voltages, high electron mobility and saturation velocity of GaN has also made it an ideal candidate for high-power and high-temperature microwave applications, as evidenced by its high Johnson's figure of merit. Potential markets for high-power/high-frequency devices based on GaN include microwave radio-frequency power amplifiers (such as those used in high-speed wireless data transmission) and high-voltage switching devices for power grids. A potential mass-market application for GaN-based RF transistors is as the microwave source for microwave ovens, replacing the magnetrons currently used. The large band gap means that the performance of GaN transistors is maintained up to higher temperatures (~400 °C) than silicon transistors (~150 °C) because it lessens the effects of thermal generation of charge carriers that are inherent to any semiconductor. The first gallium nitride metal semiconductor field-effect transistors (GaN MESFET) were experimentally demonstrated in 1993 and they are being actively developed.

In 2010, the first enhancement-mode GaN transistors became generally available. Only n-channel transistors were available. These devices were designed to replace power MOSFETs in applications where switching speed or power conversion efficiency is critical.  These transistors are built by growing a thin layer of GaN on top of a standard silicon wafer, often referred to as GaN-on-Si by manufacturers. This allows the FETs to maintain costs similar to silicon power MOSFETs but with the superior electrical performance of GaN. Another seemingly viable solution for realizing enhancement-mode GaN-channel HFETs is to employ a lattice-matched quaternary AlInGaN layer of acceptably low spontaneous polarization mismatch to GaN.

GaN power ICs monolithically integrate a GaN FET, GaN-based drive circuitry and circuit protection into a single surface-mount device.   Integration means that the gate-drive loop has essentially zero impedance, which further improves efficiency by virtually eliminating FET turn-off losses. Academic studies into creating low-voltage GaN power ICs began at the Hong Kong University of Science and Technology (HKUST) and the first devices were demonstrated in 2015. Commercial GaN power IC production began in 2018.

CMOS logic 
In 2016 the first GaN CMOS logic using PMOS and NMOS transistors was reported with gate lengths of 0.5um (gate widths of the PMOS and NMOS transistors were 500 μm and 50 μm, respectively).

Applications

LEDs and lasers 
GaN-based violet laser diodes are used to read Blu-ray Discs.  The mixture of GaN with In (InGaN) or Al (AlGaN) with a band gap dependent on the ratio of In or Al to GaN allows the manufacture of light-emitting diodes (LEDs) with colors that can go from red to ultra-violet.

Transistors and power ICs

GaN transistors are suitable for high frequency, high voltage, high temperature and high efficiency applications. GaN is efficient at transferring current, and this ultimately means that less energy is lost to heat.  

GaN HEMTs have been offered commercially since 2006, and have found immediate use in various wireless infrastructure applications due to their high efficiency and high voltage operation. A second generation of devices with shorter gate lengths will address higher frequency telecom and aerospace applications.

GaN-based MOSFET and MESFET transistors also offer advantages including lower loss in high power electronics, especially in automotive and electric car applications. Since 2008 these can be formed on a silicon substrate. High-voltage (800 V) Schottky barrier diodes (SBDs) have also been made.

The higher efficiency and high power density of integrated GaN power ICs allows them to reduce the size, weight and component count of applications including mobile and laptop chargers, consumer electronics, computing equipment and electric vehicles.

GaN-based electronics (not pure GaN) have the potential to drastically cut energy consumption, not only in consumer applications but even for power transmission utilities.

Unlike silicon transistors which switch off due to power surges, GaN transistors are typically depletion mode devices (i.e. on / resistive when the gate-source voltage is zero). Several methods have been proposed to reach normally-off (or E-mode) operation, which is necessary for use in power electronics:

 the implantation of fluorine ions under the gate (the negative charge of the F-ions favors the depletion of the channel)
 the use of a MIS-type gate stack, with recess of the AlGaN
 the integration of a cascaded pair constituted by a normally-on GaN transistor and a low voltage silicon MOSFET
 the use of a p-type layer on top of the AlGaN/GaN heterojunction

Radars
They are also utilized in military electronics such as active electronically scanned array radars.

Thales Group introduced the Ground Master 400 radar in 2010 utilizing GaN technology. In 2021 Thales put in operation more than 50,000 GaN Transmitters on radar systems.

The U.S. Army funded Lockheed Martin to incorporate GaN active-device technology into the AN/TPQ-53 radar system to replace two medium-range radar systems, the AN/TPQ-36 and the AN/TPQ-37. The AN/TPQ-53 radar system was designed to detect, classify, track, and locate enemy indirect fire systems, as well as unmanned aerial systems. The AN/TPQ-53 radar system provided enhanced performance, greater mobility, increased reliability and supportability, lower life-cycle cost, and reduced crew size compared to the AN/TPQ-36 and the AN/TPQ-37 systems.

Lockheed Martin fielded other tactical operational radars with GaN technology in 2018, including TPS-77 Multi Role Radar System deployed to Latvia and Romania. In 2019, Lockheed Martin's partner ELTA Systems Limited, developed a GaN-based ELM-2084 Multi Mission Radar that was able to detect and track air craft and ballistic targets, while providing fire control guidance for missile interception or air defense artillery.

On April 8, 2020, Saab flight tested its new GaN designed AESA X-band radar in a JAS-39 Gripen fighter. Saab already offers products with GaN based radars, like the Giraffe radar, Erieye, GlobalEye, and Arexis EW. Saab also delivers major subsystems, assemblies and software for the  AN/TPS-80 (G/ATOR)

Nanoscale
GaN nanotubes and nanowires are proposed for applications in nanoscale electronics, optoelectronics and biochemical-sensing applications.

Spintronics potential
When doped with a suitable transition metal such as manganese, GaN is a promising spintronics material (magnetic semiconductors).

Synthesis

Bulk substrates
GaN crystals can be grown from a molten Na/Ga melt held under 100 atmospheres of pressure of N2 at 750 °C. As Ga will not react with N2 below 1000 °C, the powder must be made from something more reactive, usually in one of the following ways:

2 Ga + 2 NH3 → 2 GaN + 3 H2
Ga2O3 + 2 NH3 → 2 GaN + 3 H2O

Gallium nitride can also be synthesized by injecting ammonia gas into molten gallium at 900-980 °C at normal atmospheric pressure.

Metal-organic vapour phase epitaxy 

Blue, white and ultraviolet LEDs are grown on industrial scale by MOVPE. The precursors are ammonia with either trimethylgallium or triethylgallium, the carrier gas being nitrogen or hydrogen. Growth temperature ranges between 800 and 1100 °C. Introduction of trimethylaluminium and/or trimethylindium is necessary for growing quantum wells and other kinds of heterostructures.

Molecular beam epitaxy
Commercially, GaN crystals can be grown using molecular beam epitaxy or metalorganic vapour phase epitaxy. This process can be further modified to reduce dislocation densities.  First, an ion beam is applied to the growth surface in order to create nanoscale roughness.  Then, the surface is polished. This process takes place in a vacuum. Polishing methods typically employ a liquid electrolyte and UV irradiation to enable mechanical removal of a thin oxide layer from the wafer. More recent methods have been developed which utilize solid-state polymer electrolytes which are solvent-free and require no radiation before polishing.

Safety
GaN dust is an irritant to skin, eyes and lungs. The environment, health and safety aspects of gallium nitride sources (such as trimethylgallium and ammonia) and industrial hygiene monitoring studies of MOVPE sources have been reported in a 2004 review.

Bulk GaN is non-toxic and biocompatible. Therefore, it may be used in the electrodes and electronics of implants in living organisms.

See also
Schottky diode
Semiconductor devices
Molecular-beam epitaxy
Epitaxy
Lithium-ion battery

References

External links

Ioffe data archive

Nitrides
Gallium compounds
Inorganic compounds
III-V semiconductors
Wurtzite structure type